Kizganbashevo (Kiźgänbaş) is a rural locality (a village) in Nizhnekaryshevsky Selsoviet, Baltachevsky District, Bashkortostan, Russia. The population was 158 as of 2010. There are 7 streets.

Geography 
Kizganbashevo is located 39 km south of Starobaltachevo (the district's administrative centre) by road. Starokaragushevo is the nearest rural locality.

References 

Rural localities in Baltachevsky District
Birsky Uyezd